The MRWA E class was a single member class of diesel-hydraulic shunting (switching) locomotive built by Commonwealth Engineering, Bassendean, Western Australia, for the Midland Railway of Western Australia (MRWA) in 1957. The locomotive was later owned and operated by the MRWA's successor, the Western Australian Government Railways (WAGR).

Service history
The single member of the class, E30, entered service with the MRWA in February 1957 as its first diesel powered locomotive. E30 also ended up being the company's only Western Australian made locomotive.

Together with the rest of the MRWA's assets and operations, E30 was taken over by the WAGR in 1964.

See also  
 List of Western Australian locomotive classes
 Locomotives of the Western Australian Government Railways

References

Notes

Bibliography

External links

 Commissioners Notebook, Vol. 3 No. 2 (8 January 2006) – includes article "Diesels replace steam power on Midland Railway", reproduced from Railway Transportation, August 1959.

Commonwealth Engineering locomotives
Diesel-hydraulic locomotives of Australia
Diesel locomotives of Western Australia
Railway locomotives introduced in 1957
0-6-0 locomotives
3 ft 6 in gauge locomotives of Australia